The 2016 Battle of Qamishli was a violent urban battle between the Asayish police of the Autonomous Administration of North and East Syria and the pro-Syrian government National Defence Forces in the city of Qamishli, Syria.

The battle 
On 20 April 2016, National Defence Forces militias attacked an Asayish patrol when Kurdish police failed to stop at a government checkpoint inside the Qamishli District. According to Kurdish sources the NDF killed 2 Asayish members and 2 civilians with sniper fire. Additional clashes then escalated between the two factions, with Asayish forces taking part in the fighting, killing 8 NDF members and arresting others.

The next day, the Asayish encircled government forces in the center of the city, taking over a bakery and the besieged Allaya Prison, with five Asayish fighters being killed. 45 NDF militiamen surrendered and several civilians were killed. During the battle Asayish forces removed a poster of Bashar al-Assad in captured areas. In response, the Syrian Army shelled the prison and surrounding areas with mortars, killing 4 civilians in the nearby neighborhoods. On the same day, the Islamic State of Iraq and the Levant claimed a car bomb attack that killed and wounded 15 Kurdish fighters in the city. In the evening, the NDF and Sootoro reversed some of Asayish's gains and captured two checkpoints, a stadium, and a hospital in the city.

An indefinite ceasefire was declared on 22 April. According to the ceasefire agreement, each side will keep the territory under its control. The ceasefire gave the Kurds control of more territory in Northern Syria.

Aftermath 
Nearly two dozen of the captured pro-government fighters were subsequently released under the terms of the ceasefire on 25 April.

See also 
 Battle of al-Hasakah (2016)
 Wusta clashes (2016)
 Qamishli clashes (2018)
 Siege of Qamishli and Al-Hasakah
 Qamishli clashes (2021)
 Rojava–Syria relations

References 

Qamishli
Qamishli
April 2016 events in Syria
Qamishli
Qamishli
Al-Hasakah Governorate in the Syrian civil war
Qamishli